The following is a list of episodes of House of Mouse, an American animated television series that ran on ABC from January 13, 2001 to May 18, 2002 and on Toon Disney from September 2, 2002 to October 24, 2003.

Series overview

Episodes
All episodes, excluding cartoons, were directed by Tony Craig & Roberts Gannaway

Season 1 (2001)

Season 2 (2001–2002)

Season 3 (2002–2003)

Films

External links
 

House of Mouse
House of Mouse episodes
House of Mouse